Anita Lasker-Wallfisch (born 17 July 1925) is a German-British cellist, and a surviving member of the Women's Orchestra of Auschwitz.

Family
Lasker was born into a German Jewish family in Breslau, then Germany (present-day Wrocław, Poland), one of three sisters (Marianne and Renate). Her father Alfons, brother of noted chessmaster Edward Lasker, was a lawyer; her mother a violinist. They suffered discrimination during the 1930s as the Nazis rose to power in Germany, but as her father had fought at the front in World War I, gaining an Iron Cross, the family felt some degree of immunity from Nazi persecution.

World War II
Marianne, the eldest sister, fled to England in 1939, the only family member to escape the Holocaust on the European mainland. In April 1942, Lasker's parents were taken away and are believed to have died near Lublin in Poland. Anita and Renate were not deported as they were working in a paper factory. There they met French prisoners of war and started forging papers to enable French forced labourers to cross back into France.

"I could never accept that I should be killed for what I happened to be born as, and decided to give the Germans a better reason for killing me."

In September 1942 they tried to escape to France, but were arrested for forgery by the Gestapo at Breslau station. Only their suitcase, which they had already put on the train, escaped. The Gestapo were anxious about its loss, and carefully noted its size and colour.

"I had been in prison for about a year. Then one day I was called down. A suitcase has arrived: could I identify it? It was my suitcase. They stole everything, they killed everybody, but that suitcase really mattered to them. They had found the suitcase and everything was fine, though I never saw it again because it then went into the vaults of the prison and later I saw a guard wearing one of my dresses."

Concentration camps
Anita and Renate were sent to Auschwitz in December 1943 on separate prison trains, a far less squalid way to arrive than by cattle truck, and less dangerous, since there was no selection on arrival. Playing in the Women's Orchestra of Auschwitz saved her, as cello players were difficult to replace. The orchestra played marches as the slave labourers left the camp for each day's work and when they returned. They also gave concerts for the SS.

By October 1944, the Red Army were advancing and Auschwitz was evacuated. Anita was taken on a train with 3,000 others to Bergen-Belsen and survived for six months with almost nothing to eat. After the liberation by the British Army she was first transferred to a nearby displaced persons camp. Her sister Renate, who could speak English, became an interpreter with the British Army.

During the Belsen Trial, which took place from September to November 1945, Anita testified against the camp commandant Josef Kramer, camp doctor Fritz Klein, and deputy camp commandant Franz Hössler, who were all sentenced to death and hanged that year.

Post-war
In 1946, Anita and Renate moved to Great Britain with the help of Marianne. Anita married the pianist Peter Wallfisch and is mother to two children; her son is the cellist Raphael Wallfisch, and her daughter, Maya Jacobs-Wallfisch, is a psychotherapist. Wallfisch co-founded the English Chamber Orchestra (ECO), performing as both a member and as a solo artist, and toured internationally. Her grandson is the composer Benjamin Wallfisch.

After nearly 50 years away from Germany, she finally returned there on tour with the ECO in 1994. Since that time, and as a witness and victim of the Nazi period, she has visited German and Austrian schools to talk about and explain her experiences. On this note, she promotes the work for the New Kreisau, in Poland, as well as the work of the Freya von Moltke Foundation and the Kreisau Circles legacy. In 1996 she published her memoir Inherit the Truth.

Over the years, she has told her life-story in numerous oral history interviews, for example in the Shoah Foundation's Visual History Archive (1998) and the online archive Forced Labor 1939–1945 (2006). She was interviewed by National Life Stories (C410/186) in 2000 for 'The Living Memory of the Jewish Community' collection held by the British Library.

In 2011, she received an Honorary degree as Doctor of Divinity from Cambridge University.

In 2018, she gave a commemorative speech in the Bundestag to mark the 73rd anniversary of the liberation of Auschwitz.

In December 2019 Lasker was part of a 60 Minutes story about the music written and performed by prisoners in Auschwitz being preserved by Francesco Lotoro.

In December 2020 Lasker was awarded the Officer’s Cross of the Order of Merit of the Federal Republic of Germany, which was conferred by the Federal President, Frank-Walter Steinmeier. The coronavirus pandemic delayed the presentation of the award until 20 May 2021, when Andreas Michaelis, the German Ambassador in London, presented it in a small informal event at his residence. Paraphrasing the presidential award, Michaelis commented: "To this day, you have helped keep the memory of the Holocaust alive for future generations. Germany is profoundly grateful to you for this."

References

1925 births
Living people
German classical cellists
World War II civilian prisoners
Auschwitz concentration camp survivors
Bergen-Belsen concentration camp survivors
Children in the Holocaust
Silesian Jews
People from the Province of Lower Silesia
Musicians from Wrocław
German emigrants to the United Kingdom
Jewish German writers
Naturalised citizens of the United Kingdom
German women classical cellists
British cellists
Women's Orchestra of Auschwitz members
Officers Crosses of the Order of Merit of the Federal Republic of Germany
Members of the Order of Merit of North Rhine-Westphalia
Jewish women musicians
Jewish classical musicians
British women classical cellists
Jewish British musicians
British women memoirists